The 2019 Madrilenian regional election was held on Sunday, 26 May 2019, to elect the 11th Assembly of the Community of Madrid. All 132 seats in the Assembly were up for election. The election was held simultaneously with regional elections in eleven other autonomous communities and local elections all throughout Spain, as well as the 2019 European Parliament election.

As a result of the election, the Spanish Socialist Workers' Party (PSOE) emerged as the largest political party in a Madrilenian regional election for the first time since 1987, but failed short of securing a majority together with Íñigo Errejón's Más Madrid and Unidas Podemos, the latter of which barely surpassed the 5% threshold to win seats in the Assembly. Instead, a right-of-centre alliance between the People's Party (PP), Citizens (Cs) and far-right Vox was able to muster a majority to form a government, which resulted in the election of PP candidate Isabel Díaz Ayuso as new regional president.

Overview

Electoral system
The Assembly of Madrid was the devolved, unicameral legislature of the autonomous community of Madrid, having legislative power in regional matters as defined by the Spanish Constitution and the Madrilenian Statute of Autonomy, as well as the ability to vote confidence in or withdraw it from a regional president.

Voting for the Assembly was on the basis of universal suffrage, which comprised all nationals over 18 years of age, registered in the Community of Madrid and in full enjoyment of their political rights. Additionally, Madrilenians abroad were required to apply for voting before being permitted to vote, a system known as "begged" or expat vote. All members of the Assembly of Madrid were elected using the D'Hondt method and a closed list proportional representation, with an electoral threshold of five percent of valid votes—which included blank ballots—being applied regionally. The Assembly was entitled to one member per each 50,000 inhabitants or fraction greater than 25,000. As a result of the increased population in the region, the number of seats up for election increased from 129 to 132.

Election date
The term of the Assembly of Madrid expired four years after the date of its previous election, with elections to the Assembly being fixed for the fourth Sunday of May every four years. The previous election was held on 24 May 2015, setting the election date for the Assembly on Sunday, 26 May 2019.

The president had the prerogative to dissolve the Assembly of Madrid and call a snap election, provided that no motion of no confidence was in process, no nationwide election was due and some time requirements were met: namely, that dissolution did not occur either during the first legislative session or within the legislature's last year ahead of its scheduled expiry, nor before one year had elapsed since a previous dissolution. In the event of an investiture process failing to elect a regional president within a two-month period from the first ballot, the Assembly was to be automatically dissolved and a fresh election called. Any snap election held as a result of these circumstances would not alter the period to the next ordinary election, with elected deputies merely serving out what remained of their four-year terms.

Background
On 21 March 2018, it transpired that President Cristina Cifuentes could have obtained a master's degree in the King Juan Carlos University through fraudulent means. What initially started off as a suspicion that she could have faked her CV, developed into a major scandal after a series of irregularities in the obtaining of the academic title were revealed, as well as the subsequent attempt from both the university and the regional government to cover up the scandal through document forgery. Preliminary probing revealed evidence of possible criminal offenses that were subsequently put under investigation of the judiciary, questioning Cifuentes's continuity as regional premier. After the release of a 2011 video showing her being detained in a supermarket for shoplifting, Cifuentes resigned on 25 April 2018. She was succeeded by her deputy, Ángel Garrido, who was sworn into office on 21 May. Cifuentes's scandal joined many others in a long list of corruption cases beleaguering the ruling People's Party (PP) in Spain that ended up with Prime Minister Mariano Rajoy's downfall on 1 June through a vote of no confidence in the Congress of Deputies.

On 17 January 2019, Podemos suffered a major split after it was announced that Carmena and Íñigo Errejón, Podemos candidate for regional president and one of Podemos founders, had agreed to launch a joint platform to run at the regional election. Podemos leader Pablo Iglesias announced later that day that he no longer considered Errejón as the party's candidate in the region for placing himself "outside Podemos" by renouncing the party's trademark, and that Podemos and IU would contest the regional election on their own even if that meant to compete against Más Madrid and, therefore, against Errejón. Podemos leaders also urged Errejón to resign his seat in the Congress of Deputies, considering his move as "deceitful" and "a betrayal" to the party. On 21 January, Errejón vacated his seat in the Congress, but still called for Podemos, IU and Equo to join the Más Madrid platform. On 25 January, Ramón Espinar, the regional Podemos Secretary-General, announced his resignation and his farewell from politics, allegedly after the party's national leadership deprived Espinar's regional branch of any autonomy to attempt negotiations with Errejón's platform for either running in a joint list or agreeing on a coordinated political action.
On 24 April, four days before the April 2019 Spanish general election, former president of the Community of Madrid Ángel Garrido announced his break up from the PP and his integration within Cs lists for the election.

Parliamentary composition
The Assembly of Madrid was officially dissolved on 2 April 2019, after the publication of the dissolution decree in the Official Gazette of the Community of Madrid. The table below shows the composition of the parliamentary groups in the Assembly at the time of dissolution.

Parties and candidates
The electoral law allowed for parties and federations registered in the interior ministry, coalitions and groupings of electors to present lists of candidates. Parties and federations intending to form a coalition ahead of an election were required to inform the relevant Electoral Commission within ten days of the election call, whereas groupings of electors needed to secure the signature of at least 0.5 percent of the electorate in the Community of Madrid, disallowing electors from signing for more than one list of candidates.

Below is a list of the main parties and electoral alliances which contested the election:

Campaign

Election debates

Opinion polls
The tables below list opinion polling results in reverse chronological order, showing the most recent first and using the dates when the survey fieldwork was done, as opposed to the date of publication. Where the fieldwork dates are unknown, the date of publication is given instead. The highest percentage figure in each polling survey is displayed with its background shaded in the leading party's colour. If a tie ensues, this is applied to the figures with the highest percentages. The "Lead" column on the right shows the percentage-point difference between the parties with the highest percentages in a poll.

Graphical summary

Voting intention estimates
The table below lists weighted voting intention estimates. Refusals are generally excluded from the party vote percentages, while question wording and the treatment of "don't know" responses and those not intending to vote may vary between polling organisations. When available, seat projections determined by the polling organisations are displayed below (or in place of) the percentages in a smaller font; 67 seats were required for an absolute majority in the Assembly of Madrid (65 until January 2019).

Voting preferences
The table below lists raw, unweighted voting preferences.

Preferred President
The table below lists opinion polling on leader preferences to become president of the Community of Madrid.

Results

Overall

Elected legislators 
The following table lists the elected legislators sorted by order of election.

Aftermath

Isabel Díaz Ayuso's administration represented several historical firsts for the Community of Madrid: it was the first time that the region was run by a coalition government—Ayuso's own conservative People's Party (PP) and the center-right Citizens (Cs)—and it was the first time that the far-right, represented by Vox, propped up a regional executive in the Community. A similar governing arrangement was set up in the southern regions of Andalusia and Murcia.

Notes

References
Opinion poll sources

Other

2019 in the Community of Madrid
Madrid
Regional elections in the Community of Madrid
May 2019 events in Spain